The Newport Canners were a Minor League Baseball team that played in the Class D Appalachian League from 1937 to 1942 and the Mountain States League from 1948 to 1950. The were located in Newport, Tennessee, and played their home games at City Memorial Park. The team's games were temporarily transferred to Maryville, Tennessee, for approximately two weeks late in the 1940 season.

The Canners were unaffiliated with a Major League Baseball team during six of their nine seasons but had affiliations with the New York Yankees in 1939 and the Washington Senators in 1940 and 1942. Over all nine seasons of competition, their all-time regular season win–loss record was 426–553 (.435).

History

First stretch (1937–1942)
The Canners became the first professional baseball team to hail from Newport, Tennessee, when they joined the Class D Appalachian League in 1937. The team was named for the nearby Stokely Brothers cannery. They opened their inaugural season with a 17–10 road victory over the Pennington Gap Lee Bears on May 22. Their first home game was played at the new City Memorial Park on May 26. The home team outscored Pennington Gap, 20–6. Despite a good start to the season, Newport failed to win either half of the league's split schedule with a record of 49–56 (.467), placing last of four teams. The next two seasons were the two lowest in franchise history. The 1938 Canners posted a fifth-place 42–66 (.389) record, while the 1939 club finished last of six teams at 30–89 (.252) as an affiliate of the New York Yankees.

In 1940, Newport entered into an affiliation with the Washington Senators. Following a season of poor attendance, league directors voted on July 30 to transfer the franchise to Maryville, Tennessee, for the remainder of the season. Their games were subsequently transferred back to Newport on the week of August 11. The Newport/Maryville team compiled a 56–63 (.471) record and earned a spot in the postseason playoffs, but they lost to the Greeneville Burley Cubs in the opening round, two games to one.

Returning permanently to Newport as an unaffiliated team in 1941, the Canners finished with a franchise-best 66–52 (.559) mark, again qualifying for the playoffs. Newport was eliminated in the semifinals by the Elizabethton Betsy Red Sox, 3–2. The Canners reaffiliated with Washington for the 1942 season. On June 14, Greeneville surrendered its franchise to the league due to poor attendance, and league directors subsequently voted to drop Newport due to its distance from the remaining clubs and so as to maintain an even four-team league. The club maintained their expulsion was against the league's constitution, and remained in the circuit until being forced out on June 26. Their final game that day was a 12–0 home loss to the Union City Dodgers. Their season record was 19–28 (.404). Over six years of competition in the Appalachian League, the Canners accumulated a 258–354 (.422) record. The city did not field another team from 1943 to 1947.

Second stretch (1948–1950)
In 1948, the Newport Canners were revived as members of the Class D Mountain States League. Their first game was a 6–4 loss to the Morristown Red Sox on the road on May 1. They ended the season in fourth place with a 58–59 (.496) record and qualified for the playoffs. Newport was eliminated by Morristown, 3–2, in the semifinals. The 1949 team placed sixth of eight teams with a 59–66 (.472) season.

Canners right-hander Jose Aguiar pitched two no-hitters in 1950. The first occurred on June 23 against the Big Stone Gap Rebels, a 7–0 win in the second game of a seven-inning doubleheader. He tossed a second no-hit game on August 19, beating Morristown 9–0 in the first game of a doubleheader. The Canners ended the season in seventh place at 51–74 (.408). Through three years in the Mountain States League, Newport accumulated a 168–199 (.458) record. Over all nine seasons of competition, their all-time regular season win–loss record was 426–553 (.435).

Season-by-season results

Notable players

Eight Canners also played in at least one game in Major League Baseball during their careers. These players and their seasons with Newport were:

Ed Butka (1940)
Rod Graber (1948)
Red Lucas (1942)
Red Marion (1940–1941)
Jack Merson (1940)
Al Kvasnak (1941)
Art Ruble (1939)
Tom Saffell (1941)

References

External links
Statistics from Baseball-Reference
Statistics from Stats Crew

1937 establishments in Tennessee
1950 disestablishments in Tennessee
Baseball teams established in 1937
Baseball teams disestablished in 1950
Cocke County, Tennessee
Defunct Appalachian League teams
Defunct baseball teams in Tennessee
Defunct Mountain States League (1948–1954) teams
Professional baseball teams in Tennessee